The 1955 Victorian Football Association season was the 74th season of the Australian rules football competition. The premiership was won by the Williamstown Football Club, after it recorded a come-from-behind nine-point victory against Port Melbourne in the Grand Final on 24 September. It was Williamstown's seventh premiership, its second in a row, and the second of five premierships won in six seasons from 1954 until 1959.

Premiership 
The home-and-home season was played over twenty matches, before the top four clubs contested a finals series under the Page–McIntyre system to determine the premiers for the season.

Ladder

Finals

Awards 
 The leading goalkicker for the home-and-home season was Jim Hewes (Coburg), who kicked 83 goals; the leading goalkicker after finals was Alby Linton (Williamstown), who was third behind Hewes and Peter Schofield (Moorabbin) with 73 goals in the home-and-home season, and kicked 84 goals overall.
 The J. J. Liston Trophy was won by Les Moroney (Moorabbin), who polled 37 votes. Lloyd Holyoak (Camberwell) was second with 35 votes, and Alby Linton (Williamstown) was third with 34 votes.
 Williamstown won the seconds premiership. Williamstown 10.10 (70) defeated Oakleigh 9.9 (63) in the Grand Final, played as a curtain raiser to the firsts Grand Final on 24 September.

Notable events 
 As had been the case since 1953, the players of the Northcote Football Club played as amateurs, due to the club's financial difficulties.
 Prior to the season, the Hakoah soccer club tendered an offer of £600 to the City of Camberwell for the use of the Camberwell Sports Ground on alternate weekends during the season, a move which would have left the Camberwell Football Club without a venue for its seconds team to use. The council eventually rejected the offer, deciding that in the long term the ground would be more profitable as a football venue than as a soccer venue.

External links 
 List of VFA/VFL Premiers

References 

Victorian Football League seasons
VFL